New Skin is the debut studio album by American rock band CRX. It was released on October 28, 2016. Lead singer, Nick Valensi has described the album's sound as a mix of power pop and heavy metal, and has named The Cars, Cheap Trick and Elvis Costello as influences.

Reception

New Skin received positive reviews, and currently holds a score of 69/100 on Metacritic based on nine reviews, indicating a "generally favourable" response.

Track listing

Personnel
Credits adapted from LP liner notes.

CRX
 Nick Valensi – vocals and guitar
 Jon Safley – bass and drums 
 Darian Zahedi – guitar
 Richie Follin – keyboard
 Ralph Alexander – drums 

Production and additional personnel
 Joshua Homme – production
 Andrew Scheps – mixing
 Jon Theodore – drums 
 Justin Hergett – mixing assistant
 Mark Rankin – engineering
 Gus Oberg – additional engineering
 Dan Dixon – additional engineering
 Andrew Chavez – additional engineering
 Gavin Lurssen – mastering
 Boneface – cover art
 Warren Fu – art design and direction
 Ryan Gentles – management

References

2016 debut albums
CRX (band) albums
Columbia Records albums
Albums produced by Josh Homme